Faseeh Ahmed Shah is a Pakistani politician who had been a Member of the Provincial Assembly of Sindh, from May 2013 to May 2018.

Early life and education
He was born on 4 July 1974 in Nawab Shah.

He has a Master of Arts degree in Political Science and a degree of Bachelors of Arts, both from Sindh University.

Political career

He was elected to the Provincial Assembly of Sindh as a candidate of Pakistan Peoples Party from Constituency PS-26 SHAHEED BANAZIR ABAD-III in 2013 Pakistani general election.

References

Living people
Sindh MPAs 2013–2018
1974 births
Pakistan People's Party politicians